Utekhol is a census town in Raigad district in the Indian state of Maharashtra.

Demographics
 India census, Utekhol had a population of 7286. Males constitute 51% of the population and females 49%. Utekhol has an average literacy rate of 74%, higher than the national average of 59.5%: male literacy is 79%, and female literacy is 69%. In Utekhol, 14% of the population is under 6 years of age.

References

Cities and towns in Raigad district